The subcostal arteries, so named because they lie below the last ribs, constitute the lowest pair of branches derived from the thoracic aorta, and are in series with the intercostal arteries.

Each passes along the lower border of the twelfth rib behind the kidney and in front of the Quadratus lumborum muscle, and is accompanied by the twelfth thoracic nerve.

It then pierces the posterior aponeurosis of the Transversus abdominis, and, passing forward between this muscle and the Internal Oblique, anastomoses with the superior epigastric, lower intercostal, and lumbar arteries.

Each subcostal artery gives off a posterior branch which has a similar distribution to the posterior ramus of an intercostal artery.

References

External links
  - "Branches of the ascending aorta, arch of the aorta, and the descending aorta."

Arteries of the thorax